Two ships of United States Navy were named USS Farenholt for Admiral Oscar Farenholt.
 The first  was commissioned in 1921 and decommissioned in 1930.
 The second  was commissioned in 1942 and decommissioned in 1946.

United States Navy ship names